Qamar Rahman is an Indian scientist who has worked extensively in the last 40 years to understand the physiological effects of nanoparticles. She is known internationally for her work on asbestosis, the effects of slate dust and other household and environmental particulate pollution and means for improving occupational health.

She is currently the Dean of Research Science and Technology, Amity University, Lucknow, India.

Rostock University, Germany awarded an honorary doctorate to her in 2009. Rahman is the first Indian to receive this honor from this 600-year-old university. She has studied extensively on toxicity of asbestos, soot and many other pollutants. She has also made a film on the subject of women getting exposed to toxic chemicals in the work place

Her most cited paper has been cited 450 times, according to Google Scholar.

References

External links
 Material Days Rostock

1944 births
Living people
20th-century Indian chemists
University of Lucknow alumni
Indian women biochemists
Indian toxicologists
20th-century Indian biologists
20th-century Indian women scientists
Women scientists from Uttar Pradesh
People from Shahjahanpur
Medical doctors from Uttar Pradesh